Andrew Mark Davies, FRHistS, FRSA (born 1962) is a British historian. A professor at the University of Liverpool, he specialises in the history of crime, policing and violence in modern Britain.

Career 
Born in 1962, Davies attended Sir John Deane's Sixth Form College in Northwich before studying at King's College, Cambridge, where he read history. He completed Part I of the Historical Tripos in 1983 and Part II in 1984, graduating with a Bachelor of Arts degree. He then carried out doctoral studies at King's. For his thesis on leisure and poverty in early-20th-century Manchester and Salford (supervised by A. J. Reid), he was awarded a Doctor of Philosophy degree by the University of Cambridge in 1989.

By 1991, Davies was working at the University of Liverpool. As of 2021, he is a professor of modern social history there.

Since 2009, Davies has been a fellow of the Royal Historical Society and a fellow of the Royal Society of Arts.

Bibliography 
Books

Theses

Peer-reviewed articles and book chapters

References 

1962 births
Living people
English historians
Social historians
Alumni of King's College, Cambridge
Academics of the University of Liverpool
Fellows of the Royal Historical Society